The Spartan C2 is a light aircraft produced in the United States in the early 1930s as a low-cost sport machine that would sell during the Great Depression.

Design and development
The C2 is a conventional, low-wing monoplane design with two seats side-by-side in an open cockpit. The wing was braced with struts and wires and it carried the main units of the divided fixed undercarriage. Power was supplied by a small radial engine mounted tractor-fashion in the nose, which drove a two-bladed propeller.

Spartan introduced the C2 in 1931 with a 55-hp engine, and sold 16 examples before ongoing economic circumstances brought production to a halt. Spartan then built 2 examples with 165-hp engines to use in their own flying school. These latter aircraft were fitted with hoods that could be closed over the cockpit for training pilots in instrument flying. Spartan offered this version to the U.S. military as a trainer, but officials at the time believed that low-wing monoplanes were unsuitable for pilot training. Spartan also tendered a proposal to the U.S. Bureau of Air Commerce to provide its inspectors with a two-seat light aircraft. The design in question was probably the C2-60, but in any case, the tender was not accepted.

Variants
 C2-60 — initial production version with   Jacobs L-3 engine (16 built)
 C2-165 — trainer with  Wright J-5 engine and hood for instrument training for Spartan School of Aeronautics (2 built)

Operators
 Spartan School of Aeronautics (2 × C2-165)

Aircraft on display
Three C2s are preserved in museums — a restored example on display at the Tulsa Air and Space Museum, a restored and flyable example at the Western Antique Aeroplane & Automobile Museum in Hood River, Oregon, and an example awaiting restoration at the Golden Wings Flying Museum, Blaine, Minnesota.

Specifications (C2-60)

See also

References

Notes

Bibliography
 
 
 
 
 
 
 

1930s United States sport aircraft
Spartan Aircraft Company aircraft
Low-wing aircraft
Aircraft first flown in 1931